Judy Becker is a production designer. Becker, along with set decorator Heather Loeffler, was nominated for an Academy Award for Best Production Design for the 2013 film American Hustle.

Her husband Michael Taylor is a film editor and a script supervisor.

References

External links

American production designers
Year of birth missing (living people)
Place of birth missing (living people)
Living people